Squamanita schreieri is a species of fungus in the family Tricholomataceae, and the type species of the genus Squamanita. It was first described scientifically by Emil J. Imbach in 1946.

References

External links

Fungi described in 1946
Fungi of Europe
Tricholomataceae